Gianluigi Roveta (born May 21, 1947 in Turin) is a retired Italian professional football player.

Honours
 Serie A champion: 1971/72.

References

1947 births
Living people
Italian footballers
Serie A players
Juventus F.C. players
Mantova 1911 players
Novara F.C. players
Association football defenders